Christopher Ross Doig (born 13 February 1981) is a Scottish former professional footballer and assistant manager of Grimsby Town

As a player, he was a defender who played from 1996 until 2015. He started his career with Queen of the South, where he made four appearances before being signed by Nottingham Forest in 1997. Having made 93 appearances for Forest, he was released in 2005. He joined Northampton Town, who he had previously played for on loan. In his first permanent season with Northampton, Doig won promotion to League One before being released by the club in 2009. After spells abroad with Central Coast Mariners in Australia and Pelita Jaya in Indonesia, he returned to England with Aldershot Town in 2011. He then moved to York City, with whom he won promotion to League Two after playing in the 2012 Conference Premier play-off Final. He was released in 2013 before signing for Grimsby Town, where he later became assistant to Paul Hurst. He later followed Hurst to Shrewsbury Town and Ipswich Town to continue as his assistant.

Club career

Queen of the South
Born in Dumfries, Dumfries and Galloway, Doig started his career with hometown club Queen of the South as an Associated Schoolboy. Graduating from Queen's youth programme, he played four league games for the side.

Nottingham Forest
In 1997, Doig joined Nottingham Forest in the club's youth system, going on to sign a professional contract on 7 March 1998. At Forest, Doig played 92 games scoring one goal against Rotherham United. He enjoyed a successful spell on loan in 2003 at Northampton Town.

Northampton Town
Doig signed for former club Northampton on 30 June 2005 and finished his first season with 45 appearances and three goals, as the side earned promotion to League One as League Two runners-up. He was retained as club captain by Stuart Gray when he took charge on 2 January 2007, due to Scott McGleish, former club captain, being transfer listed. Shortly before the match against Huddersfield Town in April 2007, Doig came third in the club's Player of the Year awards, behind Jason Crowe and Mark Bunn. Doig penned a two-year contract that would expire in 2009. Having made 32 appearances and scored 1 goal in the 2008–09 season, he was released by Northampton, with the side having been relegated to League Two.

Central Coast Mariners
On 9 June 2009 he signed a two-year contract with the Central Coast Mariners of the Australian A-League.

Pelita Jaya
Doig left the Mariners after no regular game time in the 2010–11 season. He then signed with Indonesia Super League side Pelita Jaya in February 2011.

Aldershot Town
After returning from Indonesia, Doig played two pre-season games for Wycombe Wanderers. After not being offered a deal by Wycombe he joined League Two side Aldershot Town on a month-by-month deal on 8 December 2011.

York City

After his deal with Aldershot ended, Doig began a trial with former his club Northampton. He eventually signed for Conference Premier club York City on a contract until the end of the 2011–12 season on 2 February 2012. He made his debut in York's 1–0 victory at home to Ebbsfleet United in the FA Trophy third round on 14 February. He played in the 2–1 victory over Luton Town in the 2012 Conference Premier play-off Final at Wembley Stadium, seeing the club return to the Football League after an eight-year absence with promotion to League Two. Having finished the season with 15 appearances for York he signed a new one-year contract with the club in July 2012.

Doig started York's 2012–13 opening game away at League One Doncaster Rovers in the League Cup first round on 11 August 2012, which the side lost 4–2 in a penalty shoot-out following a 1–1 draw after extra time. He then played in York's first Football League fixture since their promotion, a 3–1 defeat at home to Wycombe Wanderers on 18 August 2012. Doig finished the season with 16 appearances, before being released by York on 30 April 2013.

Grimsby Town
Doig signed for Conference Premier side Grimsby Town a one-year contract on 1 August 2013 as a player-coach, following a trial with the club. Doig also took over as the club's reserve team manager. He made his debut in Grimsby's away fixture at Gateshead on 14 August 2013 and scored the winning goal in a 2–1 win, as he headed home from a Paddy McLaughlin cross.

On 27 May 2014 Doig signed a new contract as Grimsby's new player-assistant manager.

International career
Doig played for Scotland at schoolboy level before representing the under-18 team, making his debut as captain in a 3–0 defeat to France on 25 October 1999. He was capped again two days later to earn his second and last under-18 cap, with Scotland beating Armenia 2–1. Doig made his under-21 debut less than a year later, coming on as a 63rd-minute substitute for Andrew Jordan in a 2–0 defeat to the Netherlands on 25 April 2000. His first start at under-21 level came in his next outing, which was a 1–1 draw with Northern Ireland on 29 May 2000. Doig made his last under-21 appearance in a 3–1 defeat to Norway on 19 August 2003, meaning he finished his under-21 career with 14 caps.

Coaching career
In 2014 Doig was appointed as player/assistant manager at Grimsby Town under the stewardship of Paul Hurst. He later combined this role with managing the club's Reserve Team after he announced his retirement in the summer of 2015.

When Hurst moved to League One side Shrewsbury Town in October 2016, Doig was once again named as his assistant. Doig later claimed he had no say on him or Hurst's departure from Grimsby to join The Shrews.

Doig added  "We got to the play-off places in League Two early in the season, then an offer came in for Paul to go to Shrewsbury, he went and I was included as part of the deal, and that’s the way it’s kind of gone. You’d need to ask Paul, but I think he knows I’m loyal and I’m honest, and I think he appreciates that. "When we’ve moved, it’s not really been a decision for me to make, it’s been made for me. When I left Grimsby, it was Paul that phoned me and said 'a deal’s been done, we’re both leaving. When we both left Shrewsbury, Paul phoned me again, 'deal’s done, we’re both going'. Nothing for me to decide really, I was included in things without having any real say as such." 

On 30 May 2018, Doig joined Paul Hurst as assistant manager at Ipswich Town. However, Doig the pair on 25 October 2018 after achieving one win in the opening 14 games of the 2018/19 season.

In May 2019 Doig followed Hurst once more to Scunthorpe United, but the pair were dismissed on 30 January 2020 with the club struggling in EFL League Two.

On 30 December 2020, Hurst and Doig returned to Grimsby, signing 18 month contracts and replacing Ian Holloway who had resigned seven days earlier.

Career statistics

Honours
Northampton Town
Football League Two runner-up: 2005–06

York City
Conference Premier play-offs: 2011–12

References

External links

1981 births
Living people
Footballers from Dumfries
Scottish footballers
Scottish expatriate footballers
Scotland youth international footballers
Scotland under-21 international footballers
Association football defenders
Queen of the South F.C. players
Nottingham Forest F.C. players
Northampton Town F.C. players
Central Coast Mariners FC players
Pelita Bandung Raya players
Aldershot Town F.C. players
York City F.C. players
Grimsby Town F.C. players
Scottish Football League players
Premier League players
English Football League players
National League (English football) players
A-League Men players
Liga 1 (Indonesia) players
Expatriate soccer players in Australia
Expatriate footballers in Indonesia
Scottish expatriate sportspeople in Australia
Scottish expatriate sportspeople in Indonesia
Grimsby Town F.C. non-playing staff
Shrewsbury Town F.C. non-playing staff
Ipswich Town F.C. non-playing staff
Scunthorpe United F.C. non-playing staff